The Taunton was a 40-gun fourth-rate frigate of the Royal Navy, originally built for the Royal Navy by William Castle at Rotherhithe, and launched in 1654.

After the Restoration of the monarchy in 1660, her name was changed to HMS Crown. By 1677 her armament had been increased to 48 guns.

In 1704, Crown underwent a rebuild at Deptford Dockyard, from where she was relaunched as a fourth-rate ship of the line of between 46 and 54 guns.

Crown was wrecked in 1719.

Notes

References

Lavery, Brian (2003) The Ship of the Line - Volume 1: The development of the battlefleet 1650-1850. Conway Maritime Press. .
 

Ships of the line of the Royal Navy
Ships built in Rotherhithe
Shipwrecks
1650s ships
Maritime incidents in 1719